Ulrike Lunacek (] born 26 May 1957) is an Austrian politician who served as State Secretary for Cultural Affairs in the government of Chancellor Sebastian Kurz in 2020. She is a member of the Austrian Green party The Greens – The Green Alternative, part of the European Green Party.

From 2009 until 2017, Lunacek was a Member of the European Parliament (MEP). During that time, she served as Vice President of the European Parliament, Member of the Greens/EFA group in the European Parliament and head of delegation of the Austrian Greens in the European Parliament. She was Kosovo rapporteur and co-president of the Intergroup on LGBTI Rights and Member of the Committee on Foreign Affairs and Substitute in the Committee on Civil Liberties, Justice and Home Affairs.  

In 2017, Lunacek was the Greens' top candidate for the Austrian general election, in which the party suffered a historic defeat and failed to win a single seat in parliament for the first time since 1983. Lunacek subsequently stepped down from all Austrian and EU political functions.

Life
From 1967 to 1975 Lunacek attended high school in the second district of Vienna. Furthermore, she spent one academic year (1973–74) as an AFS-student at a high school in Boone, Iowa. In 1975 she started studying interpreting (English and Spanish) at the University of Innsbruck and graduated in 1983. During this time she was involved in the establishment of the women's refuge Innsbruck and did social work. From 1984 to 1986 she was an adviser for the organization "Frauensolidarität" (Solidarity among Women) in Vienna. Afterwards Lunacek was editor of the magazine "Südwind" and press officer of the Austrian Information Service for Development Politics (ÖIE). In addition she worked as a freelance translator and journalist.

In 1994 Lunacek was NGO delegate at the UN International Conference on Population and Development in Cairo and a year later she coordinated the press work of all NGOs at the Fourth World Conference on Women in Beijing.

Political career
Lunacek's political career began in 1995 with the presentation of the "Appeal to reason", organized by the Austrian Lesbian and Gay Forum in Palais Auersperg, and the first-time candidacy for the Austrian Green Party, whose federal business manager she was from 1996 to 1998.

Member of the Austrian Parliament, 1999–2009
From 1999 to 2009, Lunacek was a member of parliament and the Green group's spokeswoman on foreign and development policy as well as equality for lesbians, gays and transgender persons. Also starting in 1999, she was deputy chairwoman of the Committee on Foreign Affairs.

As the first openly lesbian politician in the Austrian Parliament, she is also a member of the Greens "andersrum".

On 5 May 2006 Lunacek was elected co-chair of the European Green Party in Helsinki, a position she held for 3 years. On 28 October 2008 she became vice-chair of the Green Parliamentary Club in Austria and was nominated frontrunner for the 2009 European Parliament election.

Member of the European Parliament, 2009–2017
On 14 July 2009 Lunacek moved into the European Parliament as head of delegation of the Austrian Greens. During her tenure, she was a member of the Committee on Foreign Affairs (AFET), the Committee on Women's Rights and Gender Equality (FEMM) and the delegation to the parliamentary Cooperation Committees EU-Armenia, EU-Azerbaijan and EU-Georgia (DSCA). In addition she was a substitute member of the Committee on Civil Liberties, Justice and Home Affairs (LIBE), the delegation for relations with Albania, Bosnia and Herzegovina, Serbia, Montenegro and Kosovo (DSEE) and the delegation to the Euronest Parliamentary Assembly (DEPA). Moreover, she was the Parliament's Rapporteur for Kosovo and the foreign affairs spokesperson of the Greens/EFA group.

As co-president of the European Parliament's Intergroup on LGBTI Rights Lunacek also fought for the rights of lesbians, gays, bisexuals and transgender persons. In addition, she was a member of the European Parliament Intergroup on the Western Sahara and the European Parliament Intergroup on Children's Rights.

In 2011, European Voice reported that Lunacek, encouraged by aides to Catherine Ashton, had applied to become head of the EEAS’s office in Kosovo, but was then told that, as a non-diplomat, she was not eligible.

Lunacek led EU-Election Observer Missions on numerous occasions, including for the 2013 Honduran general elections.

In February 2013 Lunacek was elected vice-president of the Greens/EFA group in the European Parliament, under the leadership of Rebecca Harms and Daniel Cohn-Bendit. Following the 2014 European elections, the group voted for her as candidate for the presidency of the European Parliament. She served as one of the fourteen Vice Presidents of the European Parliament who sit in for the president in presiding over the plenary. In this capacity, she was in charge of the parliament’s Sakharov Prize and representing the parliament in matters concerning the Western Balkans. She was also a member of the Democracy Support and Election Coordination Group (DEG), which oversees the Parliament’s election observation missions.

Career in national politics
Lunacek briefly served as State Secretary for Cultural Affairs in the government of Chancellor Sebastian Kurz in early 2020. In May 2020, she quit under pressure from theatre directors and performers over a lack of urgency in reopening cultural venues even as a lockdown amid the COVID-19 pandemic in Austria had been eased.

Political positions
In 2013, Lunacek advocated for a non-binding resolution on "Sexual and Reproductive Health and Rights". that called for "age-appropriate and gender-sensitive sexuality and relationship education ... for all children and adolescents" and referenced a document co-authored by the WHO in which some sexuality information is deemed appropriate from age 4. After some controversy, the European Parliament instead passed a modified version which declared sexual education a competence of the member states. Lunacek called the opponents of the report “right-wing bigots” stating the groups were against “women’s right to a safe and healthy reproductive and sexual life”.

On 27 April 2017, Lunacek welcomed the release of Ramush Haradinaj, former leader of Albanian Liberation Army KLA. Haradinaj was accused of war crimes and crimes against humanity by the Serbian War crimes prosecutor and Serbia demanded his extradition. Lunacek urged EU officials to pressure Serbia to withdraw its arrest warrants.

Other activities
 Austrian Institute for International Affairs (OIIP), Member of the Board
 EastWest Institute, Member of the Parliamentarians Network for Conflict Prevention
 European Council on Foreign Relations (ECFR), Member
 European Forum Alpbach, Member of the Council
 Österreichisch-Saharauische Gesellschaft (ÖSG), Member

Awards
 Grand Gold Decoration for Services to the Republic of Austria (2009)
 Rosa Courage Award (2013)

Personal life
Lunacek had her coming-out in 1980. Since 1994 she has been living with a native Peruvian.

References

External links

 Homepage of Ulrike Lunacek
 Fanpage on Facebook
 Austrian Greens in the EP
 Greens "andersrum" 
 Biography of Ulrike Lunacek in Parliament of Austria

1957 births
Living people
Members of the National Council (Austria)
Austrian LGBT rights activists
Austrian LGBT politicians
Lesbian politicians
The Greens – The Green Alternative MEPs
MEPs for Austria 2009–2014
MEPs for Austria 2014–2019
LGBT MEPs for Austria
20th-century Austrian women politicians
20th-century Austrian politicians
21st-century women MEPs for Austria
University of Innsbruck alumni